AP-1 complex-associated regulatory protein (Gamma1-adaptin brefeldin A resistance protein) is a protein that in humans is encoded by the AP1AR gene.

References

External links

Further reading